Nicolás Carlos Cambiasso Deleau (born March 2, 1978) is an Argentine retired football goalkeeper who last played for All Boys in the Argentine Primera División. He is elder brother of Esteban Cambiasso.

Prior to All Boys he played in the Primera with Olimpo Bahia Blanca.

Honours

Individual
Ubaldo Fillol Award: Clausura 2012

References

External links
 Nicolás Cambiasso at BDFA.com.ar 

1978 births
Living people
Argentine footballers
Argentine expatriate footballers
Argentine expatriate sportspeople in Spain
Defensores de Belgrano footballers
El Porvenir footballers
Olimpo footballers
All Boys footballers
Expatriate footballers in Spain
Argentine people of Ligurian descent
Argentine people of Italian descent
Association football goalkeepers
Footballers from Buenos Aires